Ann Norton may refer to:

 Ann Frasier Norton (1893–1918), yeomanette in the U.S. Navy
 Ann McBride Norton (1944–2020), American activist and business executive
 Ann Weaver Norton (1905–1982), American sculptor and writer of children's books

See also
 Anne Norton (born 1954), American professor of political science and comparative literature